The Wu-Tang Clan is a New York City–based hip-hop musical group, consisting of ten American rappers: RZA, GZA, Raekwon, U-God, Ghostface Killah, Inspectah Deck, Method Man, Masta Killa, Cappadonna, and the late Ol' Dirty Bastard. This list chronologically displays the albums of each group member including collaboration and side group albums (such as those by Gravediggaz, Theodore Unit, or Hillside Scramblers). This list does not include compilation albums, mixtapes, or extended plays.

Wu-Tang Albums

1991
GZA (The Genius) – Words from the Genius

1993
Wu-Tang Clan – Enter the Wu-Tang: 36 Chambers

1994
RZA (with Gravediggaz) – 6 Feet Deep
Method Man - Tical

1995
Ol' Dirty Bastard – Return to the 36 Chambers: The Dirty Version
Raekwon – Only Built 4 Cuban Linx...
GZA/Genius – Liquid Swords

1996
Ghostface Killah – Ironman

1997
Wu-Tang Clan – Wu-Tang Forever
RZA (with Gravediggaz) – The Pick, the Sickle and the Shovel

1998
Cappadonna – The Pillage
Method Man – Tical 2000: Judgement Day
RZA – Bobby Digital in Stereo

1999
GZA/Genius – Beneath the Surface
Ol' Dirty Bastard – Nigga Please
Method Man (with Redman as Method Man & Redman) – Blackout!
Inspectah Deck – Uncontrolled Substance
U-God – Golden Arms Redemption
Raekwon – Immobilarity

2000
Ghostface Killah – Supreme Clientele
Wu-Tang Clan – The W

2001
Cappadonna – The Yin and the Yang
RZA – Digital Bullet
Ghostface Killah - Bulletproof Wallets
Wu-Tang Clan – Iron Flag

2002
GZA/Genius – Legend of the Liquid Sword

2003
Inspectah Deck – The Movement
RZA – Birth of a Prince
Cappadonna – The Struggle
Raekwon – The Lex Diamond Story

2004
U-God (with the Hillside Scramblers) – U-Godzilla Presents the Hillside Scramblers
Ghostface Killah – The Pretty Toney Album
Method Man – Tical 0: The Prequel
Masta Killa – No Said Date
Ghostface Killah, Cappadonna (with Theodore Unit) – 718

2005
Ol' Dirty Bastard – A Son Unique
Method Man (with Streetlife) - Method Man Presents Streetlife Street Education
U-God – Mr. Xcitement
GZA (with DJ Muggs) – Grandmasters
Ghostface Killah (with Trife Da God) – Put It on the Line

2006
Ghostface Killah – Fishscale
Masta Killa – Made in Brooklyn
Method Man – 4:21... The Day After
Ghostface Killah – More Fish
Inspectah Deck - The Resident Patient

2007
Raekwon (with Ice Water) -  Raekwon Presents Icewater Polluted Water
RZA - Afro Samurai: The Album
Ghostface Killah – The Big Doe Rehab
Wu-Tang Clan – 8 Diagrams

2008
RZA – Digi Snacks
Cappadonna – The Cappatilize Project
GZA/Genius – Pro Tools

2009
Cappadonna – Slang Prostitution
Method Man (with Redman as Method Man & Redman) – Blackout! 2
U-God – Dopium
Raekwon – Only Built 4 Cuban Linx... Pt. II
Ghostface Killah – Ghostdini: Wizard of Poetry in Emerald City

2010
Inspectah Deck – Manifesto
Method Man, Ghostface Killah, and Raekwon – Wu-Massacre
Ghostface Killah – Apollo Kids

2011
Raekwon – Shaolin vs. Wu-Tang
Cappadonna – The Pilgrimage

2012
Ghostface Killah (with Sheek Louch) – Wu Block
Masta Killa – Selling My Soul

2013
Inspectah Deck (with 7L & Esoteric as Czarface) – Czarface
Cappadonna – Eyrth, Wynd and Fyre
Ghostface Killah – Twelve Reasons to Die
 U-God – The Keynote Speaker

2014
Cappadonna – Hook Off
Wu-Tang Clan – A Better Tomorrow
Ghostface Killah – 36 Seasons

2015
Ghostface Killah (with BadBadNotGood) – Sour Soul
Raekwon – Fly International Luxurious Art
Inspectah Deck (with 7L & Esoteric as Czarface) – Every Hero Needs a Villain
Ghostface Killah – Twelve Reasons to Die II
Method Man – The Meth Lab
Cappadonna – The Pillage 2
Wu-Tang Clan – Once Upon a Time in Shaolin

2016
RZA (with Paul Banks as Banks & Steelz) – Anything But Words
Inspectah Deck (with 7L & Esoteric as Czarface) – A Fistful of Peril

2017
Raekwon – The Wild
Masta Killa – Loyalty is Royalty
Wu-Tang – The Saga Continues

2018
U-God – Venom
Inspectah Deck (with 7L & Esoteric as Czarface) – Czarface Meets Metal Face
Cappadonna – Ear Candy
Ghostface Killah - The Lost Tapes
Method Man - Meth Lab Season 2: The Lithium

2019
Ghostface Killah and Inspectah Deck (with 7L & Esoteric as Czarface) – Czarface Meets Ghostface
RZA - Thriller (Soundtrack)
Inspectah Deck - Chamber No.9
Ghostface Killah - Ghostface Killahs
Inspectah Deck (with 7L & Esoteric as Czarface) – The Odd Czar Against Us

2020 
Cappadonna – Black is Beautiful
Cappadonna – S.M.T.M. (Show Me The Money)

2021
Cappadonna - Black Tarrzann
Inspectah Deck (with 7L & Esoteric as Czarface) – Super What?

2022
RZA with DJ Scratch - Saturday Afternoon Kung Fu Theater
Cappadonna - Slow Motion
Inspectah Deck (with 7L & Esoteric as Czarface) - Czarmageddon!
Method Man - Meth Lab Season 3: The Rehab
RZA - RZA Presents: Bobby Digital and The Pit of Snakes
Cappadonna - Da Illage
Cappadonna with Stu Bangas – 3rd Chamber Grail Bars
RZA - RZA as Bobby Digital - Digital Potions

2023
Cappadonna with Shaka Amazulu The 7th - African Killa Beez

Wu-Tang Clan
Hip hop discographies
Discographies of American artists